WKFL (1170 AM) is a radio station broadcasting a classic country format. Licensed to Bushnell, Florida, United States, the station is now owned by Ferris Waller, through licensee Walco Enterprises, LLC.

History
The station went on the air as WWLB on 1986-10-06, licensed to Wildwood. On 1987-09-04, the station changed its call sign to WBEA, on 1987-11-09 to the current WKFL.
WKFL-AM 1170 Bushnell

Original Call Letters: WWLB
Originally Licensed: Oct 6, 1986
Original City of License: Bushnell
Original Frequency: 1170 
Origin of Call Letters:
Original Power: 1,000 watts daytime
Original Location:
Original Format: Country
Network Affiliation(s):

Owner(s):
1986-Sumter County Radio
1989-StarStrip Communications Inc.
1993-Maranatha Media 
2001-Walker Information & Education Institute
2001-K Florida Radio, Inc.
2004-Talknsports, Inc. ($155,000)
2011-Scott Walker
2012-Zeigler Media Svcs (LMA)
History Of  Call Letters and Formats:
WWLB-1986-Gospel
WKFL-1987-Country (Simulcast-WKIQ-AM 1240) "Country 1170 and 1240"
WBEA-1987-Country   "Country 1170"
WKFL-1992-Sports
WKFL-1992-Gospel/Sports
WKFL-1998-Urban Gospel  "American Family Radio"   "Mighty Gospel 1170 AM"   
WKFL-1998-Gospel/NASCAR/College Football
WKFL-1999-Urban Gospel
WKFL-2004-Southern Gospel
WKFL-2006-Licensed/Silent
WKFL-2007-Sports
WKFL-2007-Licensed/Silent
WKFL-2008-Sports
WKFL-2009-Licensed/Silent
WKFL-2010-Sports  "Sporting News Radio"
WKFL-2010-Classic Country  "Real Country USA"
WKFL-2011-Licensed/Silent
WKFL-2012-Classic Country "Kickin' Country"
WKFL-2018-Licnesed/Silent
WKFL-2019-Variety "Boss Hogg Radio"

References

External links

KFL
Radio stations established in 1986
1986 establishments in Florida
KFL